The Millennium Project is a think tank that publishes a State of the Future report. In 2001 it was associated with the American Council for the United Nations University. By 2007 it had become a part of the World Federation of United Nations Associations By 2014 it had become independent.

References

External links 
 
 Global Future Intelligence System

Futures studies organizations
Organizations established in 1996
Think tanks